Erin Pincott (born April 17, 1995 in Richmond, British Columbia) is a Canadian curler from Kamloops. She is the longtime third for Corryn Brown, having played together since they were six years old.

Career

Junior career
Playing for Corryn Brown, Pincott won a gold medal at the 2011 Canada Winter Games for British Columbia after winning the 2010 provincial high school championships and the 2010 BC Winter games gold medal. They represented the province at the 2013 Canadian Junior Curling Championships, which they also won. This qualified the team to represent Canada at the 2013 World Junior Curling Championships, where they finished with a 3–6 record. The team lost in the finals of the BC Juniors the following year. The team began the 2014–15 season by winning the Coronation Business Group Classic event on the World Curling Tour. Later in the year, the team won the 2015 BC Juniors. At the 2015 Canadian Junior Curling Championships, the team finished in third place. The same year, the team won a silver medal at the 2015 CIS/CCA Curling Championships for Thompson Rivers University. In Pincotts final year of juniors, the team lost in the finals of the 2016 BC juniors. The team won another silver medal for Thompson Rivers at the 2016 CIS/CCA Curling Championships.

Women's career
After juniors, Pincott joined the Karla Thompson rink for the 2016–17 season instead of playing another year in juniors. The Thompson rink won the January 2017 King Cash Spiel Tour event and went 2–5 at the 2017 British Columbia Scotties Tournament of Hearts, Pincott's first provincial championship.

The Corryn Brown rink was re-united in 2017. The team played in the 2018 British Columbia Scotties Tournament of Hearts, where they coincidentally lost to Karla Thompson in the semifinal. The team represented Thompson Rivers once again at the 2018 National University championships, winning a third silver medal.

The next season, the Brown rink won two tour events, the King Cash Spiel and the Sunset Ranch Kelowna Double Cash. At the 2019 British Columbia Scotties Tournament of Hearts, the team made it to the finals where they lost to Sarah Wark.

In the 2019–20 season, the Brown rink won two more tour events, the Driving Force Decks Int'l Abbotsford Cashspiel and the Kamloops Crown of Curling. Later in the season, the team won the 2020 British Columbia Scotties Tournament of Hearts and went on to represent British Columbia at the 2020 Scotties Tournament of Hearts, Canada's national women's championships, Pincott's first. There, BC finished with a 5–6 record and they finished in sixth place.

Team Brown began the 2020–21 curling season by winning the 2020 Sunset Ranch Kelowna Double Cash. Due to the COVID-19 pandemic in British Columbia, the 2021 provincial championship was cancelled. As the reigning provincial champions, Team Brown was invited to represent British Columbia at the 2021 Scotties Tournament of Hearts, which they accepted. At the Hearts, they finished a 4–4 round robin record, failing to qualify for the championship round.

Personal life
Pincott works as a sport performance coordinator for PacificSport Interior BC. She is in a relationship with fellow curler Matt Dunstone. In addition to attending Thompson Rivers University, Pincott attended South Kamloops Secondary School. Pincott's grandfather Grant Young represented British Columbia twice at the Brier.

References

External links

Canadian women curlers
1995 births
Curlers from British Columbia
Living people
People from Richmond, British Columbia
Sportspeople from Kamloops
20th-century Canadian women
21st-century Canadian women